"Fade to Grey" is the first song ever written by Jars of Clay. It originally was recorded for the group's debut demo album, Frail, which was released in 1994. However, when the group recorded tracks for their self-titled debut album, time and budget issues were problems in being able to record the track.

For the group's second album, Much Afraid, they decided to include the song, though many changes were made with the new recording, including some lyrical and overall arrangement changes. The new version was released as the third radio single from the Much Afraid album and reached #1 on the U.S. Christian radio charts.

Track listing
 "Fade to Grey" – 3:34 (Dan Haseltine, Charlie Lowell, Matt Bronlewee, Stephen Mason, Matt Odmark)

Performance credits
 Dan Haseltine – vocals, percussion
 Charlie Lowell – keyboards, piano, organ, background vocals
 Stephen Mason – guitars, background vocals
 Matt Odmark – guitars, background vocals
 Greg Wells – drums, bass
 Nashville Strings – strings

Technical credits
 Stephen Lipson – producer
 Robert Beeson – executive producer
 Heff Moraes – engineering, mixing
 Chuck Linder – recording
 Mike Griffith – engineering
 Adam Hatley – engineering assistant
 Stephen Marcussen – mastering
 Don C. Tyler – digital editing

1998 singles
Jars of Clay songs
Song recordings produced by Stephen Lipson
Songs written by Matt Bronleewe
Songs written by Dan Haseltine
Songs written by Charlie Lowell
Songs written by Stephen Mason (musician)
Songs written by Matt Odmark